The women's individual pursuit at the 2010 Dutch National Track Championships in Apeldoorn took place at Omnisport Apeldoorn on December 29, 2010. 14 athletes participated in the contest.

Ellen van Dijk won the gold medal, Kirsten Wild took silver and Vera Koedooder won the bronze.

Preview
Ellen van Dijk, absent in 2009 but the national champion of 2007 and 2008 was one of the favourites for the title. The main rival of Van Dijk should be Kirsten Wild, the national champion of 2009.

Competition format
The tournament started with a qualifying round. The two fastest qualifiers advanced to the gold medal final. The numbers three and four competed against each other for the bronze medal.

Race
Kirsten Wild was the fastest in the qualification round with a time of 3:42.036, however Ellen van Dijk, number 2 in the qualification round, rode in the gold medal match more than a second faster (3:41.854 vs. 3:42.999), while Wild rode slower than in the qualification (3:43.233). Ellen van Dijk became so for the third time in her career the Dutch individual pursuit champion.

Results

Qualification

Finals
Bronze medal match

Gold medal match

Final results

Results from wielerpunt.com.

References

Women's individual pursuit
Dutch National Track Championships – Women's individual pursuit